Peter Jonathan Manning (August 11, 1937 – January 5, 2019) was an American and Canadian football player who played for the Chicago Bears, Calgary Stampeders and Toronto Argonauts. He played college football at Wake Forest University in North Carolina.

References

1937 births
2019 deaths
People from Hudson, Massachusetts
Sportspeople from Middlesex County, Massachusetts
Players of American football from Massachusetts
American football defensive backs
Canadian football defensive backs
Wake Forest Demon Deacons football players
Chicago Bears players
Calgary Stampeders players
Toronto Argonauts players